The PRD Fireball is a two-stroke go-kart racing engine manufactured by Pro Racing Design Co, Ltd. Pro Racing Design is a Taipei, Taiwan based company, manufacturing an array of racing engines for use in professional go-kart racing worldwide. Pro Racing Design was founded by Chris Dell from Australia and it is now an Australian based manufacturer. The Fireball represents an engine targeted for multiple racing classes: International Kart Federation (IKF), World Karting Association (WKA) and Touch and Go (TAG) USA. The PRD Fireball is the cheapest TAG motor available to purchase new in the USA.

Specifications
 Carburetor: Tillotson HL-360A
 Cooling system: Water
 Cylinder Volume: 122.25 cc
 Bore / Stroke: 53.60 mm / 54 mm
 Horsepower / RPM: 28.5 HP / 15,580 RPM
 Oil to Fuel Ratio: 1:16 (8 oz to the gallon)

References

External links
 PRD Fireball Shop Manual (Wikibook)
 PRD Fireball Engine Manual (archived)
 Wikimedia Commons PRD Fireball Category (image library)

Kart racing
PRD petrol engines